1996 Gamba Osaka season

Review and events

League results summary

League results by round

Competitions

Domestic results

J.League

Emperor's Cup

J.League Cup

Player statistics

 † player(s) joined the team after the opening of this season.

Transfers

In:

Out:

Transfers during the season

In
 Babunski (from Lleida on July)

Out
 Sergei Aleinikov (on July)
 Atsushi Shirai (to Consadole Sapporo)
 Toshihiro Yamaguchi (to Kyoto Purple Sanga)
 Yūzo Funakoshi (loan to Telstar on July)

Awards

none

References

Other pages
 J. League official site
 Gamba Osaka official site

Gamba Osaka
Gamba Osaka seasons